Elections to Northumberland County Council were held on 2 May 2013. The full council was up for election, with each successful candidate serving a four-year term of office, expiring in 2017.

The council remained in no overall control with the Labour Party becoming the largest party, holding 32 out of 67 seats on the council. Of the remaining 35 seats on the council, the Conservative Party won the 21 seats, the Liberal Democrats won 11 seats and Independents won 3 seats.

Results

	
The overall turnout was 34.03% with a total of 84,949 valid votes cast. A total of 726 ballots were rejected.

Council Composition
Following the election, the composition of the council was:

IND - Independent

Ward results
.

Alnwick

Amble

Amble West with Warkworth

Ashington Central

Bamburgh

Bedlington Central

Bedlington East

Bedlington West

Bellingham

Berwick East

Berwick North

Berwick West with Ord

Bothal

Bywell

Choppington

College

Corbridge

Cowpen

Cramlington East

Cramlington Eastfield

Cramlington North

Cramlington South East

Cramlington Village

Cramlington West

Croft

Dudridge Bay

Haltwhistle

Hartley

Haydon & Hadrian

Haydon

Hexham Central with Acomb

Hexham East

Hexham West

Hirst

Holywell

Humshaugh

Isabella

Kitty Brewster

Longhorsley

Longhoughton

Lynemouth

Morpeth Kirkhill

Morpeth North

Morpeth Stobhill

Newbiggin Central & East

Newsham

Norham & Islandshires

Pegswood

Plessey

Ponteland East & Stannington

Ponteland North

Ponteland South with Heddon

Ponteland West

Prudhoe North

Prudhoe South

Rothbury

Seaton with Newbiggin West

Seghill with Seaton Delaval

Shilbottle

Sleekburn

South Blyth

South Tynedale

Stakeford

Stocksfield & Boomhaugh

Wensleydale

Wooler

References

External links
Northumberland County Council

2013
2013 English local elections
21st century in Northumberland